Angustiphylla is a genus of moth in the family Gelechiidae. It contains the species Angustiphylla hylotropha, which is found in South Africa.

References

Gelechiinae
Monotypic moth genera
Moths of Africa